Redway School may mean:
 Redway School (Humboldt County) is in Humboldt County, California
 The Redway School, Milton Keynes is in Milton Keynes, England